Patriarch Christopher of Alexandria may refer to:

 Patriarch Christopher I of Alexandria, Greek Patriarch of Alexandria in 817–841
 Patriarch Christopher II of Alexandria, Greek Orthodox Patriarch of Alexandria in 1939–1966